Hexamita is a genus of parasitic diplomonads. It is related to Giardia.
H. columbae and H. meleagridis live in the intestines of birds. 
H. muris and H. pitheci live in the intestines of mammals.
H. salmonis and H. truttae live in the intestines of fish.

The genus also includes the species Hexamita inflata.

It is believed that Hexamita parasites are one possible cause for head and lateral line erosion ("hole-in-the-head disease") in aquarium fishes.

References

External links
 http://medical-dictionary.thefreedictionary.com/Hexamita
 
 http://www.lexic.us/definition-of/Hexamita

Metamonads